The Biometrics and Forensic Ethics Group (formerly National DNA Database Ethics Group) is a non-departmental public body that advises the government of the United Kingdom on the ethical issues regarding collection, use, and retention of biometric and forensic material and the use of large and complex data sets and projects using explainable data-driven technology. Professor Mark Watson-Gandy took over as the chairman of the body in 2019, replacing Christopher Hughes O.B.E. who held the position since 2009.

References

External links 

 Official website

Genetics in the United Kingdom
Home Office (United Kingdom)
National DNA databases
Non-departmental public bodies of the United Kingdom government